Acosmeryx anceus is a moth of the family Sphingidae. It was described by Caspar Stoll in 1781, and it is known from India, New Guinea, and Queensland, Australia.

Description 
The wingspan is 70–88 mm.

Biology 

The larvae of subspecies subdentata have been found on plants in the genera Leea, Cayratia, Cissus, and Vitis. Larvae of ssp. anceus have been recorded on Cayratia clematidea, Cissus antarctica and Vitis vinifera.

Subspecies
Acosmeryx anceus anceus (Queensland and New South Wales)
Acosmeryx anceus subdentata Rothschild & Jordan, 1903 (southern and eastern India, Nepal, Bhutan, Thailand, southwestern China (Yunnan, Guangxi), Vietnam, Malaysia, Indonesia (Sumatra, Java, Kalimantan, Sumbawa) and the Philippines)

References

Acosmeryx
Moths described in 1781
Moths of Asia
Moths of New Guinea
Moths of Australia